Centre Culturel et Sportive Portugais de Tours is a French association football club. They are based in the town of Tours and their home stadium is the Stade des Tourettes. As of the 2009–10 season, the club plays in the Division d'Honneur Regionale de Centre, the seventh tier of French football.

External links
CCSP Tours information at fff.fr 

Tours
Sport in Tours, France
Football clubs in Centre-Val de Loire